Peter Finger (born 11 October 1954) is a German acoustic fingerstyle guitarist, songwriter, composer and record producer. His most notable recordings include "Just Another Day in May", "Vielleicht Im Nächsten Leben", "Fanesca", "For You", "101 South", "Blue Horizon", and "No Man's Land".

Allmusic journalist, Tim Sheridan, noted when relating to Finger's 1999 album, Open Strings, that "Finger displays remarkable skill and sensitivity as a musician. The title track is a standout showcase of jaw-dropping technical skill and melodic invention".

Biography

Life and career
Peter Finger was born in Weimar, Thuringia, Germany. He came from a musical family with his father being employed as an orchestral conductor, and Finger studied both violin and piano before taking lessons on guitar playing at the age of 13. He won first prize for classical violin in the Jugend musiziert on two occasions. He later studied music in Münster.

His debut recording took place in 1973, which saw Bottleneck Guitar Solos issued by Kicking Mule Records. Following further releases, Finger toured from 1976 onwards and performed worldwide. He later expanded his activities to include production work for radio, television and films. In 1981, he commenced composing works for orchestral arrangements, and this led four years later to similar work for television and film productions. In 1985, he was awarded first prize in a competition run by the Oldenburgisches Staatstheater,  for his composition "Herbstwind" ("Autumn Wind"). In the same decade, Finger also performed in a duo with the vibraphone player, Florian Poser, and in a trio with Trilok Gurtu and Charlie Mariano.

By 1988, Finger had set up his own music publishing business and record label, the latter being known as Acoustic Music Records. From 1995 onwards he worked as the publisher of the Akustik Gitarre magazine.

Finger returned to recording in the early 1990s, which included the albums Niemandsland (1993) and Solo (1995). In 2000, Finger produced the Open Strings Festival in Germany for the third time.

Live performances
In 2008, Finger performed at the Guitares au Palais.

In 2009, Finger appeared at the International Çukurova Instrumental Music Festival.

Production work
Finger has produced albums such as Guitar Bazaar (Tim Sparks, 1995), One String Leads to Another (Tim Sparks, 1999), and Vicki Genfan Live (2003).

Equipment
Finger uses mainly his own-built guitars under his 'Finger' brand, and guitars manufactured by the luthier, George Lowden.

Discography

Albums

Compilation albums

See also
Fingerstyle guitar

References

External links
 Peter Finger homepage
 Akustikgitarrist.de
 Audio sample: Peter Finger plays Getaway

1954 births
Living people
Musicians from Weimar
People from Bezirk Erfurt
German classical guitarists
German male guitarists
German rock guitarists
German songwriters
German classical composers
German male classical composers
German film score composers
Male film score composers
German record producers
German music publishers (people)
Music publishing companies of Germany
Fingerstyle guitarists
Acoustic guitarists
Music industry executives
Stockfisch Records artists